Western Sierra Collegiate Academy is a public charter school serving grades 7-12 in Rocklin, California a northeastern suburb located near Sacramento, California. It is part of the Rocklin Academy Family of Schools, which also includes two elementary schools and one TK-8 school located in Rocklin.

Administration
Robin Stout- Superintendent
Chelsea Bowler-Shelton - Principal
Sabrina Sanchez- Vice Principal/Counselor
Scott Crosson- Vice Principal/Student Life

Academics

Western Sierra Collegiate Academy public charter school serving grades 7-12. The school, as of the 2020-2021 school year, uses the Common Core State Standards.

References

External links

Charter schools in California
Schools in Placer County, California
High schools in Placer County, California
2009 establishments in California